The Ambassador from Israel to Austria is Israel's foremost diplomatic representative in Austria.

List of Ambassadors
Mordechai Rodgold 2019–present
Talya Lador-Fresher 2015–2019
Zvi Heifetz 2013–2015
Aviv Shir-On 2009–2013
Dan Ashbel 2005–2009
Avraham Toledo 2004 (Charge d'Affaires a.i. 2001–2004)
Charge d'Affaires a.i. Ilan Ben-Dov (diplomat) 2000–2001
Nathan Meron 1998–2000
Yoel Sher(Diplomat) 1995–1998
Yosef Govrin 1993–1995
Uriel Aran 1990–1993
Charge d'Affaires a.i. Gideon Yarden 1986–1990
Michael Elizur 1983–1986
Yissakhar Ben-Yaakov 1979–1983
Yaacov Doron 1977–1979
Avigdor Dagan 1974–1977
Yitzhak Patish 1971–1974
Zeev Shek 1967–1971
Michael Simon (diplomat) 1963–1967
Natan Peled 1961–1963
Yehezkil Sahar 1958–1960
Minister Shmuel Bentsur 1956–1958

Consulate (Vienna)
Consul General Shmuel Bentsur 1956–1958
Consul General Arye Eschel 1950–1955

References

Austria
Israel